Semora is a genus of South American jumping spiders that was first described by George and Elizabeth Peckham in 1892.

Species
 it contains four species, found only in Venezuela, Brazil, and Argentina:
Semora infranotata Mello-Leitão, 1945 – Argentina
Semora langei Mello-Leitão, 1947 – Brazil
Semora napaea Peckham & Peckham, 1892 (type) – Brazil
Semora trochilus Simon, 1901 – Venezuela

References

Salticidae genera
Salticidae
Spiders of South America